Philip I (c. 1052 – 29 July 1108), called the Amorous, was King of the Franks from 1060 to 1108. His reign, like that of most of the early Capetians, was extraordinarily long for the time. The monarchy began a modest recovery from the low it reached in the reign of his father and he added to the royal demesne the Vexin and Bourges.

Early life

Philip was born c. 1052 at Champagne-et-Fontaine, the son of Henry I and his wife Anne of Kiev. Unusual for the time in Western Europe, his name was of Greek origin, being bestowed upon him by his mother. Although he was crowned king at the age of seven, until age fourteen (1066) his mother acted as regent, the first queen of France ever to do so. Baldwin V of Flanders also acted as co-regent.

Personal rule

Following the death of Baldwin VI of Flanders, Robert the Frisian seized Flanders. Baldwin's widow, Richilda, requested aid from Philip, who was defeated by Robert at the battle of Cassel in 1071.

Philip first married Bertha of Holland in 1072. Although the marriage produced the necessary heir, Philip fell in love with Bertrade de Montfort, the wife of Fulk IV, Count of Anjou. He repudiated Bertha (claiming she was too fat) and married Bertrade on 15 May 1092. In 1094 following the synod of Autun, he was excommunicated by the papal representative, Hugh of Die, for the first time; after a long silence, Pope Urban II repeated the excommunication at the Council of Clermont in November 1095. Several times the ban was lifted as Philip promised to part with Bertrade, but he always returned to her; in 1104 Philip made a public penance and must have kept his involvement with Bertrade discreet. In France, the king was opposed by Bishop Ivo of Chartres, a famous jurist.

Philip appointed Alberic first Constable of France in 1060. A great part of his reign, like his father's, was spent putting down revolts by his power-hungry vassals. In 1077, he made peace with William the Conqueror, who gave up attempting the conquest of Brittany. In 1082, Philip I expanded his demesne with the annexation of the Vexin, in reprisal against Robert Curthose's attack on William's heir, William Rufus. Then in 1100, he took control of Bourges. Philip expanded the royal demesne by incorporating the monasteries of Saint-Denis and Corbie.

It was at the aforementioned Council of Clermont that the First Crusade was launched. Philip at first did not personally support it because of his conflict with Urban II. Philip's brother Hugh of Vermandois, however, was a major participant.

Death

Philip died in the castle of Melun and was buried per his request at the monastery of Saint-Benoît-sur-Loire – and not in St Denis among his forefathers. He was succeeded by his son, Louis VI, whose succession was, however, not uncontested. According to Abbot Suger:

Issue
Philip's children with Bertha were:
 Constance (1078 – 14 September 1126), married Hugh I of Champagne before 1097 and then, after her divorce, to Bohemund I of Antioch in 1106.
 Louis VI of France (1 December 1081 – 1 August 1137).
 Henry (1083 – died young).

Philip's children with Bertrade were:
 Philip, Count of Mantes (1093 – fl. 1123), married Elizabeth, daughter of Guy III of Montlhéry
 Fleury, Seigneur of Nangis (1095 – July 1119)
 Cecile (1097 – 1145), married Tancred, Prince of Galilee and then, after his death, to Pons of Tripoli.

References

Sources

|-

11th-century kings of France
12th-century kings of France
House of Capet
People excommunicated by the Catholic Church
Medieval child monarchs
1052 births
1108 deaths